Bayahíbe is a town in the Dominican Republic, located about  east of La Romana on the shore of the Caribbean Sea. Founded as a fishing village in 1874 by Juan Brito and his family, who came from Puerto Rico, the town is now a tourist destination.

Etymology
Bayahíbe is an indigenous word. Its meaning is not known for sure, but there are many names that include the Tainos word "Baya." "Baya" is the name given to a bivalve mollusk, like clams that are glued to the rocks or roots of mangrove trees. "Jib" (or "hib") is the name of a sieve manufactured from sticks used to sift cassava flour.

Tourism

Bayahíbe Beach, a public beach, is located less than a mile from the town center, and Dominicus Beach is in about three miles' distance. Bayahíbe serves as an embarkation point for boat trips to Saona Island, a thinly inhabited island with extensive beaches located in a national park. Numerous large resorts are located in the vicinity of Bayahíbe.  In Bayahíbe there is the first "dispersed hotel" of Dominican Republic founded by Fabrizio Annunzi with the name of Bayahibe Village.

Scuba diving and other watersports

Scuba diving is probably the most common tourist attraction in Bayahíbe—Bayahíbe being the best location for scuba in the Dominican Republic. There are numerous scuba diving shops scattered around the main beach that take scuba divers to the many dive sites around the area. There are over 20 official dive sites located near Bayahíbe and all are accessible from the dive boats in the area. There are three shipwrecks in the area including the Atlantic Princess, St George and Coco.
Bayahíbe benefits from the crystal clear, calm waters of the Caribbean Sea which makes it perfect for many water sports including snorkeling and stand up paddle boarding. Deep sea fishing is another popular activity.

Infrastructure
The electricity is powered by Consorcio Energético Punta Cana-Macao (CEPM), a wind and solar energy producer led by US-based Argentine businessman Rolando Gonzalez-Bunster.

The Bayahibe beach 

Walking to reach the public beach of Bayahibe, you will see practically the entire town, including the many and varied restaurants where you can find local and international food, shops and excursion companies. On this beach you will find sun loungers, hammocks and umbrellas available for rent, as well as several restaurants serving typical Dominican food, very convenient to have drinks and food during the day on the beach. We recommend trying the fried fish: it is delicious and very characteristic of the place.

On Sundays this beach is very crowded, as Dominican families (which tend to be very large) love to go out to relax and cook their food with their feet in the sand.

This beach is near the port of Bayahibe, but the swimming area is safe and the boats are kept at a safe distance. The seabed is sandy, with few rocks here and there. Some prefer to wear rubber shoes, but it is not necessary. On the best days the water is crystal clear and calm, but depending on the weather, wind, rain, and currents, it can turn cloudy. Like the entire Bayahibe bay, wave formation is very rare. From here you will have a total view of the bay and the port, with all the catamarans and boats moored.

With a bit of luck, you might even find a few starfish on the sandy bottom. We kindly ask you not to take them out of the water because, like all fishes, they cannot breathe. However, if you are lucky enough to find them, come and look at them. They are wonderful. There is a small reef where you may see some fish, but we do not recommend it as a dive site.

There are no lifeguards on this beach. There are many trees that provide their shade, ideal for resting when the heat of the sun rises in the middle of the day.

The beach is also accessible by car; parking is just behind the restaurants. If you decide to reach it on foot, it is best to simply follow the coast.

Cueva del Chicho 

It is one of the most outstanding caves in the country. It is located within the Cotubanamá National Park, its deep and crystalline aquamarine waters attract many visitors. It also contains numerous petroglyphs that affirm the presence of the Tainos in this place.

In its beginnings Padre Nuestro was a small community of 180 families, in 2003, the community was relocated to the outskirts of the National Park and Padre Nuestro became a reserve, where today, visitors can walk the 2-kilometer trail along the forest and discover the caves and springs with petroglyphs and the art of the Tainos.

Part of the springs in this area have petroglyphs on their walls, which, for the ancient inhabitants of the area, made them authentic temples full of magic and spirituality. The water from these caves and springs are the main providers of water for the people of Bayahibe.

The Bayahibe rose 

In Bayahíbe grows a small group of plants that are extremely important to the biological characteristics of this area: in particular, the pereskia quisqueyana. This plant species is endemic to Bayahíbe. It is known for its beautiful flowers. The popular name by which this pink flower is known is "Bayahíbe rose."

Audrey Mestre

References 

Populated places in La Altagracia Province
Beaches of the Dominican Republic
Tourist attractions in La Altagracia Province